The  were senior fiscal officials of the Republic of Venice.

Although they are first attested in 1236, they are likely much older in origin. Originally two, they were increased to three in 1527.

They were further tasked with imposing fines on debtors to the state, and proposing cost-saving measures. They were allowed to dispose of sums up to ten gold ducats. Their main residence was in the Zecca of Venice, but they also had proper offices in the Rialto, in the Palazzo dei Camerlenghi.

References

Sources
 

Government of the Republic of Venice
Treasurers